Aleisha Power (born 1 January 1997) is an Australian field hockey player, who plays as a goalkeeper.

Personal life
Aleisha Power was born and raised in Northam, Western Australia.

Career

Domestic hockey

Australian Hockey League
From 2015 until the league's dissolution in 2018, Power was a member of the WA Diamonds squad in the Australian Hockey League (AHL).

Hockey One
In 2019, Hockey Australia introduced the Sultana Bran Hockey One, a new premier domestic hockey competition to replace the AHL. Power was named in the Perth Thundersticks team for the inaugural season of the league, where she appeared in all six games.

Australia

Under–21
Aleisha Power was first named in the Australia U–21 squad in 2015. She made her first appearance for the team later that year, in a series of test matches against Argentina in Buenos Aires.

In 2016, she was a member of the team at the Junior Oceania Cup on the Gold Coast. She followed this up with a bronze medal appearance at the FIH Junior World Cup in Santiago.

At the Junior World Cup, Power was awarded Goalkeeper of the Tournament.

Hockeyroos
Power made her Hockeyroos debut in 2017, during a test series against Japan in Adelaide.

She didn't make another appearance for the team until 2021, when she was named in the Hockeyroos squad for the first time.

References

External links
 
 
 

1997 births
Living people
Australian female field hockey players
Female field hockey goalkeepers
Field hockey players at the 2022 Commonwealth Games
Sportswomen from Western Australia
20th-century Australian women
21st-century Australian women
Commonwealth Games silver medallists for Australia
Commonwealth Games medallists in field hockey
People from Northam, Western Australia
Medallists at the 2022 Commonwealth Games